MumBaee is India's first in-taxi magazine, to be introduced in the taxicabs of Mumbai. It is provided free of cost to members of the Mumbai Taximens’ Union.

See also
 Transport in India

References

2009 establishments in Maharashtra
English-language magazines published in India
Free magazines
Magazines published in India
Local interest magazines
Magazines established in 2009
Mass media in Mumbai
Taxis of India